The 2022 WNBA Commissioner's Cup presented by Coinbase was the WNBA's second Commissioner's Cup in league history. The Cup Final featured the top Eastern Conference Cup team facing off against the top Western Conference team. The home team was decided by the team with the highest winning percentage in Cup Play.

Road to the Cup Final
The Commissioner's Cup starts by designating a portion of regular-season games – 10 games per team – as counting toward Cup play. The team from each conference with the top record in designated “Cup games” then compete for the Commissioner's Cup title and a special prize pool. Cup games are the first home game and first road game each team plays against its five conference rivals.

The Las Vegas Aces clinched the Western Conference spot in the Cup Final on June 15, 2022, after their win against the Dallas Wings. The Chicago Sky clinched the Eastern Conference spot on June 19, 2022.

Standings
Source:

Funding to Local Non-Profits
New this year will be incentives to win with money going to local nonprofits. The WNBA will donate $2,000 to the chosen organization of each cup game's winning team and an additional $500 to the losing team's organization. In the Championship Game for the Commissioner's Cup, the league will donate $10,000 to the winning team's chosen organization and $5,000 to the organization of the runner-up. The accumulating donation dollars will be presented to each organization at the conclusion of the Commissioner's Cup.

Game Summary

Team rosters

References

External links
WNBA.com

Recurring sporting events established in 2020
Women's National Basketball Association Commissioner's Cup